Wollstein may refer to:

 Wöllstein, Germany
 Wöllstein (Verbandsgemeinde), Germany
 Wolsztyn, Poland